Megaceresa is a genus of moths in the family Saturniidae first described by Charles Duncan Michener in 1949.

Species
Megaceresa pulchra (Bouvier, 1923)

References

Ceratocampinae